"Song to the Evening Star" ("O du, mein holder Abendstern"), also known as "Oh Star Of Eve", is an aria sung by the character Wolfram (baritone) in the third act of Richard Wagner's 1845 opera Tannhäuser. Wolfram greets the Evening Star (the planet Venus) for offering hope in darkness; with an implied contrast to Tannhäuser's lover Venus at the beginning of the opera, in her underground realm Venusberg.

Franz Liszt wrote in 1849 a paraphrase for piano of this aria, S. 444, arranged with Bernhard Cossmann for cello and piano in 1852 as S. 380.

It has been arranged for voice and piano, and for various wind instruments and piano.

References

External links
 A parallel text in German and English.

Compositions by Richard Wagner
Opera excerpts
1845 songs
Baritone arias
Arias in German